Kern River is the fortieth studio album by American recording artist Merle Haggard backed by The Strangers, released in 1985. It reached number 8 on the Billboard country albums chart.

Background
The album is best remembered for its title track, which hit the Top 10 in the summer of 1985. The song also played a part in Haggard's souring relationship with his record label.  In his 1999 memoir My House of Memories, the singer recalls being summoned to CBS in Nashville with Ray Benson in tow where an executive casually remarked, "Well, I still don't like 'Kern River,'" and suggested, despite Haggard's run of hits in the first half of the decade, that he listen to songs by a group of assembled young songwriters  Haggard exploded, saying to the executive, "Go over there and pick up one of those guitars.  Show me a chicken claw D.  Sing me your latest song," and later recalled, "To this day, my blood pressure rises when I tell the story." The LP alternates between smooth, country/pop melancholy, such as "You Don't Love Me Anymore" and "There's Somebody Else On Your Mind," and nostalgic nods to big band western swing like "Old Watermill" and his cover of Louis Armstrong's "Big Butter and Egg Man." The LP also contains a rendition of the 1980 Dolly Parton #1 "Old Flames Can't Hold a Candle to You." The version of "Natural High" found on this album differs from the one on Haggard's previous album It's All in the Game in that it features Janie Fricke on background vocals. Haggard had originally recorded "I Wonder Where I'll Find You at Tonight" on his 1972 album It's Not Love (But It's Not Bad).

Reception

Stephen Thomas Erlewine of AllMusic states that while the LP "isn't his best record of the '80s, it's possibly the best example of Haggard's far-reaching, varied tastes as he settled into his veteran status." In the 2013 book Merle Haggard: The Running Kind, biographer David Cantwell calls the title track "a scary record" that "screamed quiet and startled you alive."

Track listing
"Kern River" (Merle Haggard)
"Old Flames Can't Hold a Candle to You" (Patricia Rose Sebert, Hugh Moffatt)
"There, I've Said It Again (Redd Evans, David Mann)
"You Don't Love Me Anymore" (Freddy Powers)
"Natural High" (Freddy Powers)
"Big Butter and Egg Man" (Louis Armstrong, Percy Venable)
"Ridin' High" (D. Reynolds, Powers)
"There's Somebody Else On Your Mind" (Haggard)
"I Wonder Where I'll Find You at Tonight" (Haggard)
"There Won't Be Another Now" (Red Lane)
"Old Watermill" (B.H. Harris)

Personnel
Merle Haggard– vocals, guitar

The Strangers:
Roy Nichols - guitar
Norm Hamlet - steel guitar
Tiny Moore - fiddle, mandolin
Mark Yeary - keyboards
Dennis Hromek - bass guitar
Biff Adams - drums
Jim Belkin - fiddle
Don Markham – horns

with:
Freddy Powers - rhythm guitar
Grady Martin – electric guitar
Bobby Wood - keyboards
Bill Hullett - guitar
Janie Fricke - background vocals

Charts

Weekly charts

Year-end charts

References

Merle Haggard albums
1985 albums
Epic Records albums
Kern River